The 2018 Berkeley Tennis Club Challenge was a professional tennis tournament played on outdoor hard courts. It was the first edition of the tournament and was part of the 2018 ITF Women's Circuit. It took place in Berkeley, United States, on 16–22 July 2018.

Singles main draw entrants

Seeds 

 1 Rankings as of 2 July 2018.

Other entrants 
The following players received a wildcard into the singles main draw:
  Gail Brodsky
  Ashley Lahey
  Maegan Manasse

The following players received entry from the qualifying draw:
  Haruna Arakawa
  Lorraine Guillermo
  Connie Ma
  Pamela Montez

Champions

Singles

 Sofia Kenin def.  Nicole Gibbs, 6–0, 6–4

Doubles

 Nicole Gibbs /  Asia Muhammad def.  Ellen Perez /  Sabrina Santamaria, 6–4, 6–1

External links 
 2018 Berkeley Tennis Club Challenge at ITFtennis.com
 Official website

2018 ITF Women's Circuit
2018 in American tennis
Tennis tournaments in California
Sports in the San Francisco Bay Area
2018 in sports in California